A clapping game (or hand game) is a type of usually cooperative (i.e., non-competitive) game which is generally played by two players and involves clapping as a rhythmic accompaniment to a singing game or reciting of a rhyme, often nursery rhymes. Clapping games are found throughout the world and similar games may be known throughout large areas with regional variation.

Nature of the games

Due to the communication skills and coordination required, simple clapping games are age appropriate for children age 24 months and above. In many cultures clapping games are played by both sexes and all ages, but in many European and European-influenced cultures, they are largely the preserve of girls.

Claps commonly included in patterns are clapping one's own hands, clapping both hands of a partner, and clapping one hand of a partner, generally across such as the right hand of each player. The clapping may include other activities such as thigh slapping, or a final move such as touching the ground and freezing. Sara Bernstein describes seventy-nine "basic hand-claps".

Clapping patterns may be used with only specific rhymes, generically with most rhymes, or improvised. Children in different areas may be more or less strict about which claps accompany which rhymes but generally different clapping patterns may be used to accompany different rhymes. The rhymes are generally very similar to a jump-rope rhymes. Some games are played without a rhyme, such as 'Slide', and not all require the players to clap each other's hands, such as 'Sevens.'

Clapping games are a part of oral tradition. As such there are a variety of distinct clapping games or families of games. A game may be performed or played in various versions found in different areas and times and often according to ethnicity. For example, "Hello, Operator" may be called "Miss Susie" or "Miss Lucy" and may contain, omit, or vary verses or specific lines. Clapping patterns and actions may also vary. There is no canonical version of any game though children often fight over whose version is "right" or "real".

Examples

Clapping games include:

 "A Sailor Went to Sea"
 "Down Down Baby" (also known as "Roller Coaster")
 "Down by the Banks"
 "Mary Mack"
 "Miss Susie"
 "Pat-a-cake, pat-a-cake, baker's man"
 "Pease Porridge Hot"
 "Pretty Little Dutch Girl"
 "Stella Ella Ola"
 "Cup game"
 "Crocidilly"
 "Four White Horses"
 "Bobo Ski Waten Taten"

See also
Palmas (music)

References

External links
  videos and sound recordings from the British Library showing clapping games over the last century

 
Street games